Roggenburg is a municipality in the district of Neu-Ulm in Bavaria in Germany.

Roggenburg is known for the Roggenburg Abbey, which is used today by the Premonstratensians. An environment and culture center with an overregional commuting area is located near the abbey.

Geographical location 
The municipality lies in the region "Donau-Iller" in central Swabia, approximately 30 km southeast of Ulm and 40 km north of Memmingen. The districts Roggenburg, Biberach and Meßhofen are located on the Biber river, the districts Ingstetten, Schießen and Unteregg at the Osterbach, while Schleebuch is located between these two rivers.

Politics 

The municipal council has 14 members plus the major.

References

External links

 
 Official statistics

Neu-Ulm (district)